Dave Given (born May 14, 1954) is an American former professional ice hockey right winger. He played one game in the World Hockey Association for the Vancouver Blazers. He is an alumnus of Brown University.

Given grew up in Chatham Township, New Jersey and played hockey at Chatham Township High School, where he scored 36 goals and added 31 assists in the 1969–70 season. Chatham Township set a league record in a 23–0 win against Montclair Academy, in which Given scored eight goals, the first one scored six seconds into the game.

References

External links

1954 births
American men's ice hockey forwards
Brown Bears men's ice hockey players
Buffalo Norsemen players
Buffalo Sabres draft picks
Charlotte Checkers (SHL) players
Ice hockey players from New Jersey
Living people
People from Chatham Township, New Jersey
Sportspeople from Morris County, New Jersey
Sportspeople from Summit, New Jersey
Tidewater Sharks players
Vancouver Blazers draft picks
Vancouver Blazers players